This is a list of television programmes broadcast by Nickelodeon in India. The channel was launched on October 16, 1999.

Current programming

Animated series 
 Chikoo Aur Bunty
 Motu Patlu

 Rudra

Live-action 
 Power Rangers

Former programming

Live action/mixed 
 Action League Now!
 Artzooka!
 Clarissa Explains It All
 Dougie in Disguise
 Drake & Josh
 Dum Dama Dum
 Fetch the Vet
 Figure It Out
 Genie in the House
 Gilli Gilli Gappa
 Globo Loco
 J Bole Toh Jadoo 
 Jai Shri Krishna
 The Journey of Allen Strange
 Junior G
 Kenan & Kel
 LazyTown
 Legends of the Hidden Temple
 Mr. Meaty
 NG Knight Ramune & 40
Nick Kathakali
 Nickelodeon Guts
 The Munnabhai Show
 Power Rangers
Power Rangers Super Ninja Steel 
Power Rangers Ninja Steel  
 Power Rangers Dino Super Charge
 Power Rangers Dino Charge
 Power Rangers Super Samurai
 Power Rangers Samurai
 Power Rangers Megaforce
 Sam & Cat
 Tricky TV
 Unfabulous
 Uncle Max

Animated series 
 Aaahh! Real Monsters
 The Adventures of Jimmy Neutron: Boy Genius
 The Angry Beavers
 As Told by Ginger
 Avatar: The Last Airbender
 Back at the Barnyard
 Backkom
 Batfink
 Bigfoot Presents: Meteor and the Mighty Monster Trucks
 Blue's Clues
 CatDog
 ChalkZone
 Chicken Stew
 The Daltons
 Danny Phantom
 Dennis the Menace
 Dora the Explorer
 Dreamkix
 Gattu Battu 
 Go, Diego, Go!
 The Harveytoons Show
 Hey Arnold!
 Invader Zim
 Journey to the West – Legends of the Monkey King
 Kaeloo
 Keymon Ache 
 Little Krishna
 Little Spirou
 Oggy and The Cockroaches 
 Pakdam Pakdai
 The Penguins of Madagascar/>
 Rocket Monkeys
 Rocket Power
 Rocko's Modern Life
 Rudra
 Rugrats
 Shaktimaan: The Animated Series
Shiva
 Skyland
 SpongeBob SquarePants
 Tak and the Power of Juju
 Teenage Mutant Ninja Turtles
 Tony & Alberto
 The Wild Thornberrys
 Winx Club
 Atashin'chi
 Chibi Maruko-chan
 Dinosaur King
 Idaten Jump
 Jankenman
 Mighty Cat Masked Niyander
 Ninja Hattori
 Perman

See also 
 Nickelodeon (Pakistan)
 List of programs broadcast by Nickelodeon (Pakistan)
 Nickelodeon Sonic
 List of Indian animated television series
 List of programmes broadcast by Cartoon Network (India)
 List of programmes broadcast by Disney Channel (India)
 List of programmes broadcast by Pogo
 List of programmes broadcast by Hungama TV
 List of programmes broadcast by Discovery Kids (India)
 Marvel HQ (India)
 Sony Yay

References 

India
Nickelodeon (India)
Nickelodeon (India)